Doğan Kabak (born 23 April 1980) is a Turkish rally driver.

He was born in 1980. In Turkey, at the moment, he is the publisher of Top Gear Turkey and Health & Fitness magazines. Before that, he was editor chief at AutoCar and EVO magazine. At the same time, he attended a lot of Rally and Track races, and he acquired degrees.

He won the first place at class 7 in the 2014 Turkey Autocross championship with Mitsubishi Lancer Evolution.

He represented Turkey at the Mazda mx-5 open race, which took place in Italy in 2009.

References

Turkish rally drivers
Living people
1980 births